Natalia, Natalya or Nataliya Ivanova may refer to:

 Natalia Ivanova (taekwondo) (born 1971), Russian Olympic taekwondo competitor and medalist
 Natalya Ivanova (hurdler) (born 1981), Russian hurdler
 Natalia Ivanova (wrestler) (born 1969), Russian and Tajikistani sport wrestler
 Natalia Ivanova (sailor), Russian Olympic sailor and medalist, participated in Sailing at the 2004 Summer Olympics – Europe